Charles Anthony Hughes (March 21, 1890 – July 11, 1967) was an actor in American films and television. He appeared in several Three Stooges films.

Partial filmography

The Crimson Flash (1927) as Dale (as Tony Hughes)
Mark of the Frog (1928), a 10-chapter film serial (credited as Tony Hughes) 
The West Parade (1932)
Crime Without Passion (1934) (uncredited)
Always in Trouble (1938)
Ride a Crooked Mile (1938)
Touchdown Army (1938)
The Frontiersmen (1938) as Mayor Judson Thorpe 
Ladies in Distress (1938) as Lieutenant
Women in the Wind (1939) as Bill Steele
The Last Alarm (1940) as Lieutenant King
Timber Queen (1944 film) as Harold Talbot
Practically Yours (1944) as Radio Announcer
Masquerade in Mexico (1945) as FBI agent
Blue Dahlia as Lieutenant Lloyd
Roughly Speaking (1945) as Financier
The Cariboo Trail (1950) as Dr. John S. Rhodes (as Tony Hughes) 
Highway Dragnet (1954) as Chubby Border Inspection Officer (as Tony Hughes)
Daddy Long Legs (1955), a musical, as Hotel Manager

References

20th-century American male actors
1890 births
1967 deaths